Ángela Valle (née Etna María de los Ángeles Valle Cerrato; January 7, 1927 - May 9, 2003) was a Honduran writer, journalist, and essayist. In 1967, she was awarded the first prize "Premio Nacional de Poesía Juan Ramón Molina".

Biography
Etna María de los Ángeles Valle Cerrato was born in Comayagüela, January 7, 1927. Her parents were Bernardo Valle Hernández and Ana Leonor Cerrato Salgado. In her youth, in honor of her paternal grandmother, Ángela Hernández, she adopted the pseudonym of Ángela Valle.

Valle worked as a journalist in Honduras for various newspapers, including El Día, El Cronista, and La Prensa. As a poet, she composed in a traditional way, using the sonnet or long and rhymed poems, but also using modern forms of free verse. Her work has been incorporated into various anthologies of literature such as Poesía hondureña del siglo XX by Claude Couffon, 1997. She died in Tegucigalpa, May 9, 2003.

Awards
 1967, first prize, Premio Nacional de Poesía Juan Ramón Molina

Selected works 
Arpegios
Azahares
Inicial
La celda impropia
Las flores de mayo
Lúnulas (Premio Nacional de Poesía Juan Ramón Molina)
Más allá de la cruz
Nombre para un soneto
Pajarera de luz
Plaqueta de la ausencia
Sirte

References

1927 births
2003 deaths
20th-century Honduran writers
20th-century Honduran poets
20th-century Honduran women writers
Honduran women poets
Honduran journalists
Honduran women journalists
Pseudonymous women writers
20th-century journalists
20th-century pseudonymous writers